Șchei (shkei) was an old Romanian exonym referring to the Bulgarians, especially in Transylvania and northern Wallachia. As a name, it has been preserved in the names of towns colonized in the 14th century by Bulgarians, in toponyms (Dealu Schiaului near Rășinari), hydronyms (Schiau River, tributary to the Argeş River), surnames (Schiau, Șchiau). The word is thought to derive from Latin sclavis, a popular designation for the South Slavs (Bulgarians and Serbs in particular) that is still used in Albanian (in the form shkja and various dialectal variants).

Șchei villages in Transylvania
Among the towns or neighbourhoods bearing that trace of Bulgarian settlement are:

 Șcheii Brașovului in Brașov (traditional Romanian name: Bulgărimea)
 Cergău Mic in Alba County (archaic , archaic )

Other places in Transylvania that used to be inhabited by various waves of Bulgarians were Cergău Mare, Bungard, Vințu de Jos, Deva, Rusciori and Râșnov.

Șchei villages in Wallachia and Moldavia
 Șchei, a quarter and former independent settlement in Câmpulung settled by Bogomil Bulgarians.
 Schiau village in Bascov commune, Argeș County
 Schiau (Urlați) and Schiau (Valea Călugărească) in Prahova County
 Șcheia commune in Suceava County
 Șcheia commune in Iași County
 Șcheia village in Alexandru Ioan Cuza commune, Iași County

References

Further reading 
 Ion Mușlea, Șcheii de la Cergău şi folclorul lor, Cluj 1928.
 
 

Ethnonyms
Medieval Transylvania
Romanian exonyms
Wallachia
Romanian people of Bulgarian descent
South Slavic history